Begumpur Union is a union parishad of Chuadanga Sadar Upazila, in Chuadanga District, Khulna Division of Bangladesh. There are 20 villages and 19 mouzas in the union.

References

External links
 

Unions of Khulna Division
Unions of Chuadanga District
Unions of Chuadanga Sadar Upazila